Overload is a studio album by American musician Georgia Anne Muldrow. It was released on October 26, 2018, by Brainfeeder. Overload received a nomination for Best Urban Contemporary Album at the 62nd Grammy Awards.

Release
On September 13, 2018, Muldrow announced the release of her new studio album, along with the single "Aerosol".

Critical reception
Overload was met with "generally favorable" reviews from critics. At Metacritic, which assigns a weighted average rating out of 100 to reviews from mainstream publications, this release received an average score of 80 based on 10 reviews. Aggregator Album of the Year gave the release a 77 out of 100 based on a critical consensus of 9 reviews.

Accolades

Track listing

Personnel 

Technical personnel
 Georgia Anne Muldrow – producer
 Mike & Keys – producer
 Moods – producer
 Lustbass – producer
 Flying Lotus – executive producer
 Aloe Blacc – executive producer
 Dudley Perkins – executive producer
 Daddy Kev – mastering

Artwork
 Martin Norwood – cover art
 Adam Stover – layout, design

References

2018 albums
Brainfeeder albums